The SP Technical Research Institute of Sweden, is a joint stock company, fully owned by the Swedish government. It was formerly known as the National Swedish Authority for Testing, Inspection and Metrology (SP), thus the abbreviation SP. The company has its headquarters in Borås and employs 1,000 persons.

Business areas include, among other things, applied research, technical studies and investigations, quality assurances, standardization and certification.

References

External links
 SP Technical Research Institute of Sweden

Standards organizations in Sweden
Multidisciplinary research institutes
Research institutes in Sweden